Burncoose is a hamlet near Gwennap in west Cornwall, England; Burncoose lies on the A393 road,   south-east of Redruth. It was first recorded in 1277 as Burncoys, an anglicized name from the Cornish Broncoos, meaning "wood hill".

See also

Williams family of Caerhays and Burncoose

References

Further reading
 Burncoose Gardens: a garden oasis in the minewastes of Cornwall; by F. J. Williams C.B.E., Arnold Dance, David Knuckey.

Hamlets in Cornwall